The 2006 Football League Cup Final also known as the 2006 Carling Cup Final for sponsorship reasons, was played between Manchester United and Wigan Athletic on 26 February 2006. Manchester United won the match comfortably, by four goals to nil. Louis Saha and Cristiano Ronaldo both scored one goal, and Wayne Rooney scored twice. For the trophy presentation, the Manchester United players wore special shirts reading "For You Smudge", referring to Alan Smith, who had broken his left leg during a recent FA Cup match against Liverpool. Wigan goalkeeper Mike Pollitt picked up a hamstring injury after just 14 minutes, cutting short a dream cup final for the journeyman player, who started his career with the Red Devils.

Road to Cardiff

Match details

Statistics

References

External links
Match facts at soccerbase.com

Cup Final
League Cup Final 2006
League Cup Final 2006
League Cup Final
2006
2000s in Cardiff
Football League Cup Final